Clark A. Schrontz was a professional American football player. In 1902 he won a championship in the first National Football League with the Pittsburgh Stars. A year later he was a member of the Franklin Athletic Club football team that was considered the "best in the world". He also won the 1903 World Series of Football, held at Madison Square Garden, with the Franklin Athletic Club.

Schrontz then spent the next several seasons with the Massillon Tigers of the Ohio League. In 1905 the Tigers promoted him to the position of "field captain". In 1906, he was convinced by Blondy Wallace, coach of the Canton Bulldogs to join the Bulldogs. That season Canton played Massillon in a two game home-and-home series to determine the 1906 Ohio League championship. While Canton won the first game of the series, Massillon won the second game (and under rules determined by both team) the championship. Canton was later accused of throwing the championship in a betting scandal.

Prior to his professional career Clark played three years at end while attending Washington and Jefferson College. He had a reputation as being one of the fastest men to get down the field during a punt.  The football team adopted a poodle as their mascot, naming it "Schrontzie" in Clark's honor.

References

Year of birth missing
Year of death missing
American football ends
Bethany Bison football coaches
Canton Bulldogs (Ohio League) players
Franklin Athletic Club players
Massillon Tigers players
Pittsburgh Stars players
Washington & Jefferson Presidents football players